Dr Rashmi Doraiswamy is a National Film Award winning film critic. She received her M. Phil from the Centre for Russian Studies, Jawaharlal Nehru University (Delhi, India) for her dissertation, 'A Critique of Mikhail Bakhtin’s Theory of Literature in the Context of Contemporary Theories of Literature and the Formalist School of the 20s'. She is currently Professor (Central Asia) at the MMAJ Academy of International Studies, Jamia Millia Islamia

Books
Co-editor - Being and Becoming: The Cinemas of Asia (Macmillan, 2002).
Co-author - Encyclopedia of Postcolonial Literatures in English (Chapter: ‘Film and Literature (India)’; Routledge, 2005)
Co-author - Image and Imagination: Reconstructing the Nation, in ‘India: A National Culture (SAGE Publications, 2003)
Co-author - Hindi Commercial Cinema: Changing Narrative Strategies in Frames of Mind: Reflections on Indian Cinema (ed. Aruna Vasudev), UBS Publication, 1995
Co-author - Idiocy and Civilisation: A Study of Dostoevsky’s The Idiot in The Russian Enigma (ed. Madhavan Palat and Geeti Sen, UBS Publications, 1994)
Author - The Post-Soviet Condition: Chingiz Aitmatov in the ’90s (Aakar, 2005).

Translations (Russian To English)
Piranesi, Sergei Eisenstein, Excerpts from his book ‘Non-Indifferent Nature’, Cinemaya 2, 1989
Distanced Montage/A Theory of Distance, Artavazd Peleshyan, Cinemaya 3, 1989
Ishmukhamedov’s Shok, Djhura Teshabaev, Cinemaya 8, 1990
Landmarks in Tadjik cinema, Ato Akhrorov, Cinemaya 13, 1991
Trying Times: Women Directors in the Asian Republics, Andrei Plakhov, Cinemaya 27, 1995
Lessons from the East, Andrei Plakhov, Cinemaya 41,1998
Women behind the camera in Kazakh Cinema, Cinemaya 42, 1998
Evgeny Margolit, ‘Cinemas of Central Asia’, in Being and Becoming, Macmillan, New Delhi, 2002
L Trotsky’s Theory of Imperialism and the Universal Crisis of Capitalism, V Serebryakov

Awards and accolades
 MAJLIS research fellowship for project entitled ‘Changing Narrative Strategies of hindi Cinema’.
Certificate of Appreciation by Tadjik Filmmakers’ Union, for the active promotion of Tajik cinema.
National Film Award for Best Film Critic

Jury duty
Selection committee member, Foreign films -  IFFI-2005
Selection committee member - Talent Campus India (part of Berlin Film Festival/Cinefan scout for young filmmakers from India)
Member, Feature Film Jury - National Film Awards 
Member, Book Jury - National Film Awards
Member, 54th National Film Awards
Member, FIPRESCI Jury - Sochi International Film Festival
Member - Kinotavr Open Russian Film Festival
Member -  National Film Awards for Non-Feature Films
FIPRESCI Jury - Toronto International Film Festival
NETPAC Jury - Taiwan International Documentary Festival
Member of the jury - Mumbai International Film Festival
Member of the jury - Mannheim International Film Festival

See also
Film Critics Circle of India

References

External links
 Jamia Milla

Year of birth missing (living people)
Living people
Indian film critics
Indian women critics
Indian women translators
20th-century Indian translators
21st-century Indian translators
21st-century Indian women writers
21st-century Indian writers
20th-century Indian women writers
Women writers from Delhi
Writers from Delhi
Best Critic National Film Award winners